George Robert Cobb (August 26, 1885 – February 13, 1957) was an American football and basketball coach and college athletics administrator.  
He served as the head football coach at Rhode Island State College—now known as the University of Rhode Island—from 1909 to 1911 and again from 1913 to 1914, compiling a record of a 17–16–5. Cobb was also the head basketball coach at Rhode Island State from 1910 to 1913, tallying a mark of 13–9, and the school's athletic director from 1909 to 1916. He graduated from the University of Massachusetts Amherst in 1908. Cobb died on February 13, 1957, as Peninsula General Hospital in Salisbury, Maryland.

Head coaching record

Football

References

External links
 

1885 births
1957 deaths
Basketball coaches from Massachusetts
Rhode Island Rams athletic directors
Rhode Island Rams football coaches
Rhode Island Rams men's basketball coaches
UMass Minutemen football players
College men's basketball head coaches in the United States
University of Massachusetts Amherst alumni
People from Granby, Massachusetts
Players of American football from Massachusetts